BGJ may refer to:

 Bangolan language, ISO 639-3 code 'bgj'
 Bharatiya Gorkha Janashakti, a political party in West Bengal, India